Events from the year 1833 in the United Kingdom.

Incumbents
 Monarch – William IV
 Prime Minister – Charles Grey, 2nd Earl Grey (Whig)
 Foreign Secretary – Henry John Temple, 3rd Viscount Palmerston 
 Parliament – 11th (starting 29 January)

Events
 3 January – reassertion of British sovereignty over the Falkland Islands by British forces in the South Atlantic.
 18 April – over 300 delegates from England, Scotland, Wales and Ireland travel to the office of the Prime Minister to call for the immediate abolition of slavery throughout the British Empire. 
 25 May – Royal Horticultural Society holds the first flower show in Britain.
 14 July – John Keble preaches a sermon on "National Apostasy" (in part a protest against the Church Temporalities (Ireland) Act 1833), launching the Oxford Movement within the Church of England.
 August – Parliament begins annual grants for 50% of the cost of constructing new denominational schools.
 28 August – the Slavery Abolition Act receives Royal Assent, abolishing slavery in most of the British Empire, coming into effect 1 August 1834. A £20 million fund is established to compensate slaveowners.
 29 August – the Factory Act makes it illegal to employ children less than 9 years old in factories and limits child workers of 9 to 13 years of age to a maximum of 9 hours a day.
 31 August – chartered ship Amphitrite sinks off Boulogne-sur-Mer while undertaking the penal transportation of 108 British female convicts and 12 children from Woolwich to New South Wales with the loss of 133 lives; only 3 crew survive.
 December – Edwin Chadwick introduces the Ten Hours Bill in Parliament.

Undated
 Bank Notes Act gives Bank of England notes over £5 in value the status of "legal tender" in England and Wales.
 Quakers and Moravians Act allows Quakers and Moravians to substitute an affirmation for a legal oath in accordance with their religious beliefs. Joseph Pease becomes the first Quaker to take his seat in Parliament.
 Francis Goldsmid is the first Jew to become an English barrister.
 The Preston Temperance Society is founded by Joseph Livesey, pioneering the temperance movement and teetotalism.
 Laying out of Moor Park, Preston, by the local authority as a (partly) public park begins.

Publications
 First of the Bridgewater Treatises, examining science in relation to God.
 Serialisation of Thomas Carlyle's Sartor Resartus in Fraser's Magazine.
 Charles Dickens' first published work of fiction, "A Dinner at Poplar Walk", first of what will become Sketches by Boz, appears unsigned in the Monthly Magazine (London, 1 December).
 Edward Bulwer's novel Godolphin.
 Mrs Favell Lee Mortimer's instructional text The Peep of Day, or, A series of the earliest religious instruction the infant mind is capable of receiving.
 Alfred Tennyson's collection Poems including "The Lady of Shalott".
 Publication of The Penny Cyclopædia of the Society for the Diffusion of Useful Knowledge edited by George Long begins.
 William Sandys' collection Christmas Carols Ancient and Modern.

Births
 23 January – Sir Lewis Morris, Anglo-Welsh poet (died 1907)
 28 January – Charles George Gordon, British army officer and administrator (died 1885)
 27 July – Thomas George Bonney, geologist (d. 1923)
 12 August – Aylmer Cameron, VC recipient (d. 1909)
 26 August – Henry Fawcett, statesman, economist and Postmaster General (d. 1884)
 28 August – Sir Edward Burne-Jones, Anglo-Welsh artist (d. 1898)
 4 November – James James, harpist and composer of the Welsh national anthem (d. 1902)
 11 December – Francis E. Anstie, physician and medical researcher (d. 1874)

Deaths
 9 January – Sir Thomas Foley, admiral (b. 1757)
 23 January – Edward Pellew, 1st Viscount Exmouth, admiral (b. 1757)
 16 April – Henry Herbert, 2nd Earl of Carnarvon (b. 1772)
 22 April – Richard Trevithick, Cornish-born inventor, mechanical engineer and builder of the first working railway steam locomotive (b. 1771)
 15 May
 Bewick Bridge, mathematician (b. 1767)
 Edmund Kean, actor (b. 1787)
 2 June – Simon Byrne, prizefighter (b. 1806)
 10 July – George Agar-Ellis, 1st Baron Dover, politician and man of letters (b. 1797)
 29 July – William Wilberforce, abolitionist (b. 1759)
 27 September – Ram Mohan Roy, Bengali reformer (b. 1772)
 11 November – James Grant, navigator (b. 1772)
 3 December – Adam Buck, Irish-born neo-classical portraitist and miniature painter (b. 1759)

See also
 1833 in Scotland

References

 
Years of the 19th century in the United Kingdom